The Principality of Qandahar was a state that existed in Qandahar from 1818 to 1855. It was ruled by the Dil brothers, members of the Barakzai dynasty, in a confederation. In 1855 the principality was conquered by Dost Mohammad Khan.

History 
In 1818, the Dil brothers seized Qandahar and its surroundings and declared independence. Sher Dil Khan was in charge of the military in the principality. The rule of the four brothers was very unpopular. Sher Dil Khan was supposed to be in charge of Qandahar's walls but after his death the brothers fought each other and allowed the city's walls to fall into decay.

In 1842 Kohan Dil Khan, Mehr Dil Khan, and Rahim Dil Khan left their exile in Kerman and set out towards Qandahar. They occupied Qandahar and re-established the principality. In the aftermath of the First Anglo-Afghan War, Kohan Dil Khan aimed to expand his influence into Sistan, which had fractured into a number of tribal fiefdoms. As part of this move, Kohan Dil Khan expanded his sphere of influence up to the district of Rudbar, controlled by the Sanjarani Baluch. Herat under Yar Mohammad Khan Alakozai also claimed Sistan as part of his domain, and this would cause clashes between both powers.

Territory and subdivisions 
Initially, in the 1820s and 1830s, the territories under the control of the Principality consisted of Zamindawar, Deh Rawood, Garmsir, Shorawak, Pishin, and Sibi. The Hazaras of Uruzgan paid tribute to the principality. Sindh and Balochistan were also dependent on the principality, but was able to break away in August 1826. The territory of the principality seems to have been split among the various brothers. At the time of Charles Masson's visit to Qandahar during the reign of Pur Dil Khan, the division of the principality seems to have been as follows:

 Pur Dil Khan (in possession of the district of Qandahar and its surroundings)
 Kohan Dil Khan (controlled the frontier with Herat and the lands of Garmsir, Zamindawar, Deh Rawood, Uruzgan, and the Alizais, Nurzais, and Hazaras living there)
 Mehr Dil Khan (controlled the frontier bordering on the domains of the Tokhi and Hotak tribes)
 Rahim Dil Khan (controlled the districts of Sibi, Pishin, and Shorawak)

Rulers 
 Sher Dil Khan (1818 – July 1826)
 Pur Dil Khan (July 1826 – 1830)
 Kohan Dil Khan (1830 – 25 April 1839)
 Shuja ul-Mulk (1839 – 5 April 1842)
 Kohan Dil Khan (5 April 1842 – August 1855)
 Civil War (August – November 1855)

References 

History of Kandahar Province
History of Kandahar
Former political entities in Afghanistan
19th century in Afghanistan